State Highway 47 (SH-47) is a  state highway in the U.S. State of Idaho. SH-47 runs from U.S. Route 20 (US-20) in Ashton to near Warm River.

Route description
SH-47 starts at an intersection with US-20 and heads due east as Main Street through Ashton. The highway continues east after an intersection with the northern terminus of SH-32, passing through Marysville as East 1300 North. Slowly, SH-47 bends to the north as Mesa Falls Scenic Byway, going through Warm River and crossing over the same-named river. SH-47 ends in the Targhee National Forest.

Junction list

References

External links

047
Transportation in Fremont County, Idaho